Sbata is an arrondissement of Casablanca, in the Ben M'Sick district of the Casablanca-Settat region of Morocco. As of 2004 it had 122,827 inhabitants.

References

Arrondissements of Casablanca
Neighbourhoods of Casablanca
Morocco geography articles needing translation from French Wikipedia